The  is an electric multiple unit (EMU) train type used for commuter and outer-suburban services operated by East Japan Railway Company (JR East) in Japan since 2000.

Design

Trains were manufactured by Tokyu Car Corporation, Kawasaki Heavy Industries and also at JR East's factory at Niitsu in Niigata Prefecture.

Full-production E231-0 series trains were subsequently introduced on the Chūō–Sōbu Line (10-car sets) and Jōban Line (10+5-car sets).

From 2000 onward, the first E231-1000 series outer-suburban variant was delivered for use on Utsunomiya Line and Takasaki Line services north from Ueno Station in Tokyo. These trains included transverse seating in some cars and were also equipped with toilets. Production continued into 2006 with trains delivered for use on the Tōkaidō Main Line south from Tokyo. From 2004 onward, two bilevel Green cars were inserted into all E231-1000 series ten-car sets.

Variants
  /  /  E231-0 series: 5-car, 8-car, and 10-car sets used on the Chūō–Sōbu Line, Jōban Line, Narita Line, Musashino Line, and Keiyō Line
  E231-500 series: 10-car sets used on the Chūō–Sōbu Line
  E231-800 series: 10-car sets used on Chūō–Sōbu Line and Tokyo Metro Tozai Line interrunning services
  E231-900 series: 8-car set used on the Musashino Line and Keiyō Line
  E231-1000 series: 5-car and 10-car suburban sets used on the Tōkaidō Main Line, Utsunomiya Line, and Takasaki Line, and on Ueno–Tokyo Line and Shōnan–Shinjuku Line through services
  E231-3000 series: 4-car sets converted from former E231-0 series sets for use on the Kawagoe Line and Hachikō Line

Former operations 
 E231-500 series: 11-car sets used on the Yamanote Line from 21 April 2002 until 20 January 2020
  E231-900 series: 10-car set used on the Chūō–Sōbu Line from December 1998 until 25 February 2020 (designated as 209-950 series until June 2000)

E231-0 series

The first full-production E231-0 series trains were introduced on the Chūō–Sōbu Line between February 2000 and November 2001, with 21 ten-car sets (101–121) based at Narashino Depot in Chiba and 21 ten-car sets (20–25, 28–42) based at Mitaka Depot in Tokyo. They replaced older 103, 201, and 205 series trains. One more ten-car set (57) was delivered to Mitaka Depot in November 2002. In December 2003, all Narashino sets were transferred to Mitaka Depot and renumbered 1–19, 26, and 27. Between October and November 2006, three more sets (80–82) were built to replace three 209-500 series sets transferred to the Keihin–Tōhoku—Negishi Line, creating a total fleet of 46 trains. The Chūō–Sōbu Line sets each contained a six-door car.

New built E231-0 series sets were also delivered to Matsudo Depot between November 2001 and February 2005 for use on Jōban Line services between Ueno and Toride, and also Narita Line services to Narita, replacing the earlier 103 series fleet. A total of 17 ten-car sets (101–117) and 19 five-car sets (121–139) were built.

From December 2009 to November 2011, set 27 was temporarily transferred to Tokyo General Rolling Stock Center and used to deliver new SaHa E231-600 and SaHa E231-4600 trailer cars for the Yamanote Line. In 2012, a "B" suffix was added to all Chūō–Sōbu Line sets (B1–B42, B57, and B80–B82).

Refurbishment
Between 2015 and 2020, all E231-0 series sets underwent a mid-life refurbishment with new equipment. In addition, with the transfer of former Yamanote Line E231-500 series sets to the Chūō–Sōbu Line and to prepare for the installation of platform doors, 40 trains were transferred from the Chūō–Sōbu Line to other lines, while six trains were reformed and remain on the Chūō–Sōbu Line with all six-door cars replaced with excess four-door cars from the other 40 sets.

In late 2014 and early 2015, two Chūō–Sōbu Line sets (B20 and B21, with six-door cars substituted by two trailer cars from B22) were transferred to the Jōban Line (and renumbered 118 and 119) for the extension of the Jōban Line services to Shinagawa Station with the opening of the Ueno–Tokyo Line. This brought the total number of Jōban Line sets to 38 (19 five-car and 19 ten-car sets), all of which were refurbished between 2015 and 2020.

From October 2017 to September 2020, 32 Chūō–Sōbu Line sets were refurbished, shortened to eight cars, and transferred to the Musashino Line (and renumbered MU2–MU21, MU31–MU39, and MU41–MU43) to replace older 205 series and 205-5000 series sets; the first set (MU2) entered service in November 2017.

From November 2017 to October 2019, six Chūō–Sōbu Line sets were refurbished, shortened to four cars, redesignated as E231-3000 series, and transferred to the Hachikō Line and Kawagoe Line.

The first reformed E231-0 series Chūō–Sōbu Line train (with 6 motored cars and no six-door car), numbered set B11 and composed of 8 cars of former set B11 and 2 cars of former set B5, completed refurbishment on 24 April 2018 and reentered into service on 21 May 2018. A total of six reformed ten-car trains remain on the Chūō–Sōbu Line. The last non-reformed trains (with 4 motored cars and a six-door car), sets B80 and B82, were removed from service after 13 March 2020.

Between 17 August and 7 October 2020, Jōban Line set 118 was shortened to 8 cars and modified for use on the Musashino Line at Nagano depot. It was renumbered MU22 and reentered service on 12 October.

Transfers from Chūō–Sōbu Line

Lines served 
 Chūō–Sōbu Line
 Jōban Line (Rapid) (Toride - Ueno), Ueno–Tokyo Line, Tōkaidō Line (Tokyo - Shinagawa) and Narita Line (Abiko - Narita)
 Musashino Line, Keiyō Line (also Musashino and Shimōsa)

Formations

10-car Chūō–Sōbu Line 6M4T sets (since 2018)
, six ten-car sets (B10–B12, B14, B26, B27) are based at Mitaka depot in Tokyo and formed as shown below with six motored ("M") cars and four non-powered trailer ("T") cars.

 Cars 2, 5, and 8 each have one PS33B single-arm pantograph.
 Cars 1 and 10 have a wheelchair space.
 Car 4 is designated as a mildly air-conditioned car.

10-car Jōban Line sets
, 18 ten-car sets (101–117, 119) are based at Matsudo depot in Chiba Prefecture and formed as shown below with four motored ("M") cars and six non-powered trailer ("T") cars.

 Cars 3 and 8 each have one PS33B single-arm pantograph.
 Cars 1 and 10 have a wheelchair space.
 Car 8 is designated as a mildly air-conditioned car.

5-car Jōban Line sets
, 19 five-car sets (121–139) are based at Matsudo depot in Chiba Prefecture and formed as shown below with two motored ("M") cars and three non-powered trailer ("T") cars.

 Car 13 has one PS33B single-arm pantograph.
 Cars 11 and 15 have a wheelchair space.
 Car 14 is designated as a mildly air-conditioned car.

8-car Musashino Line sets
, 33 eight-car sets (MU2–MU22, MU31–MU39, MU41–MU43) are based at Keiyō Depot and formed as shown below with four motored ("M") cars and four non-powered trailer ("T") cars.

 Cars 2 and 6 each have one PS33B single-arm pantograph.
 Cars 1 and 8 have a wheelchair space.
 Car 4 is designated as a mildly air-conditioned car.

Previous formations

10-car Chūō–Sōbu Line 4M6T sets (2002 to 2020)

 Cars 3 and 8 each had one PS33B single-arm pantograph.
 Car 5 had six pairs of doors per side.
 Cars 1 and 10 had a wheelchair space.
 Car 4 was designated as a mildly air-conditioned car.

Interior

Special liveries

In April 2021, to commemorate the 120th anniversary of the Abiko Branch Line, JR East recolored set 139 into Sōbu/Yokosuka Line blue and cream stripes. Initially, only the cab ends received the commemorative stripes; however, these stripes were later extended to the rest of the train's body. The trainset was painted back into its original livery in late October.

E231-500 series

A fleet of 52 11-car E231-500 series was delivered from January 2002 to April 2005 for use on Yamanote Line services, replacing the earlier 205 series fleet. The first trains entered service on 21 April 2002. These trains include digital automatic train control (D-ATC), and feature pairs of LCD passenger information screens above each door internally. These screens also show advertisements. Each 11-car set originally contained two six-door SaHa E230 trailer cars (cars 7 and 10) with six pairs of doors per side and bench seats that were folded up until 10 a.m. on weekdays to provide standing room only during the morning peak. From 22 February 2010, the seats were able to be used during the morning peak.

SaHa E231-600/-4600 series cars
To standardize door spacing ahead of the introduction of platform doors on all Yamanote Line stations by 2017, the two six-door cars in each set were subsequently replaced by a new build of four-door trailer cars between February 2010 and August 2011, the first of which were delivered from JR East's Niitsu factory on 1 February 2010.

The new SaHa E231-600 cars (new car 7) incorporated some elements from the newer E233 series (most notably seats and handrails). The new SaHa E231-4600 cars (new car 10) were built almost fully to E233 series standards; they also have an irregular door spacing corresponding to the driving cars of Keihin–Tōhoku Line E233-1000 series sets, which occasionally have to share the same platforms during engineering work. This results in interior seating arranged 3-7-7-5-4, instead of the normal 3-7-7-7-3 arrangement.

Refurbishment
In October 2014, former Yamanote Line set 520 was released from overhaul as a ten-car set, numbered A520, allocated to Mitaka Depot, and finished in the yellow Chūō–Sōbu Line livery. It entered revenue service on the Chūō–Sōbu Line from 1 December 2014. A second set, former Yamanote Line set 540 was converted to a ten-car set for use on the Chūō–Sōbu Line in May 2016, renumbered A540. Between 2017 and 2020, the remaining sets were transferred to the Chūō–Sōbu Line as the E235 series replaced them on the Yamanote Line. The SaHa E231-4600 cars were removed as the Chūō–Sōbu Line uses 10-car trains. As a result, 48 of the 52 surplus SaHa E231-4600 cars were updated to E235 series standards (and re-numbered SaHa E235-4600) and continue to be used on the Yamanote Line, while the remaining 4 cars were scrapped. The last set of E231-500 (Set 506) on the Yamanote Line finished service in January 2020 and was converted for service on the Chūō–Sōbu Line as set A506.

Lines served
 Chūō–Sōbu Line

Former operations
 Yamanote Line

Formations

10-car Chūō–Sōbu Line sets
, 52 ten-car sets (A501-A552) are based at Mitaka depot in Tokyo and formed as shown below with six motored ("M") cars and four non-powered trailer ("T") cars.

 Cars 2, 5, and 8 each have one PS33B single-arm pantograph.
 Cars 1 and 10 have a wheelchair space.
 Car 4 is designated as a mildly air-conditioned car.

Previous formations

11-car Yamanote Line sets (2010 to 2020)

 Cars 3, 6, and 9 each had one PS33B single-arm pantograph.
 Cars 1 and 11 had a wheelchair space.
 Car 4 was designated as a mildly air-conditioned car.

11-car Yamanote Line sets (2002 to 2011)

 Cars 3, 6, and 9 each had one PS33B single-arm pantograph.
 Cars 7 and 10 was a "six door car" meaning it had six pairs of doors per side.
 Cars 1 and 11 had a wheelchair space.
 Car 4 was designated as a mildly air-conditioned car.

Interior

Special liveries
From 7 September to 4 December 2009, E231-500 series set 502 carried an all-over brown livery to mark the 100th anniversary of the naming of Yamanote Line in collaboration with the Meiji Seika confectionery company.

From 16 January to 28 December 2013, Yamanote Line E231-500 series set 545 operated in an all-over uguisu light green livery to mark the 50th anniversary of the first appearance of 103 series EMUs in this colour scheme.

From 11 October 2014 to 31 March 2015, Yamanote Line E231-500 series set 514 operated in an all-over "red brick" livery to commemorate the 100th anniversary of the opening of Tokyo Station, which opened in 1914.

E231-800 series

The  fleet consists of seven 10-car sets (K1 to K7), which are based at Mitaka Depot for use on Chūō–Sōbu Line and Tokyo Metro Tozai Line inter-running services. These sets were delivered between January and May 2003, entering service on 1 May 2003 and replacing the ageing fleet of 103 and 301 series sets.

The design of the E231-800 series is largely similar to that of the 209-1000 series—which was also designed with subway interoperation in mind—featuring end gangways that are used for emergency egress. They also have an increased power output due to the conditions of the Tozai Line.

Lines served 
 Tokyo Metro Tozai Line
 Chūō–Sōbu Line (Mitaka - Nakano; Nishi-Funabashi - Tsudanuma)

Formations
, seven ten-car sets (K1 to K7) are based at Mitaka depot in Tokyo and formed as shown below with six motored ("M") cars and four non-powered trailer ("T") cars.

 Cars 2, 5, and 8 each have one PS33B single-arm pantograph.
 Cars 2 and 9 have a wheelchair space.
 Car 4 is designated as a mildly air-conditioned car.

E231-900 series

This was the prototype E231 series set, built jointly by Tokyu Car and JR East's Niitsu factory, and delivered in October 1998 for the Chūō–Sōbu Line, classified as 209-950 series. It was reclassified as E231-900 series in June 2000.

On 25 February 2020, it operated its last revenue service on the Chūō–Sōbu Line. The set was refurbished at Ōmiya Rolling Stock Center between 3 March and 10 July for transfer to the Musashino Line and associated through services and reentered service on 20 July.

Lines served 
 Musashino Line, Keiyō Line (also Musashino and Shimōsa)

Former operations 
 Chūō–Sōbu Line

Formation

8-car Musashino Line
, one eight-car set (MU1) is based at Keiyō Depot and formed as shown below with four motored ("M") cars and four non-powered trailer ("T") cars.

 Cars 2 and 6 each have one PS33B single-arm pantograph.
 Cars 1 and 8 have a wheelchair space.
 Car 4 is designated as a mildly air-conditioned car.

Previous formation

10-car Chūō–Sōbu Line (2000 to 2020)

 Cars 3 and 8 each had one PS33B single-arm pantograph.
 Car 5 had six pairs of doors per side.
 Cars 1 and 10 had a wheelchair space.
 Car 4 was designated as a mildly air-conditioned car.

E231-1000 series

These trains are designed for longer-distance suburban services, and include toilets, transverse seating bays (in some cars only), and bilevel Green cars (10-car sets only). The Ito Line and Joetsu Line mainly use 5-car sets, while the Shōnan–Shinjuku Line, Ueno–Tokyo Line, Takasaki Line, Tōkaidō Main Line, Utsunomiya Line use 10- or 10+5-car sets.

Lines served 

Ten- and five-car suburban sets based at Oyama and Kōzu depots for use on the following lines.
 Takasaki Line ( - ) and Joetsu Line (Takasaki - Shin-Maebashi) and Ryōmō Line (Shin-Maebashi - Maebashi)
 Utsunomiya Line (Ueno - )
 Tōkaidō Main Line ( -  / )
 Itō Line (Atami - Itō, through services from Tōkaidō Main Line)
 Ueno–Tokyo Line (Ueno - Tokyo)
 Takasaki Line (Ueno - Takasaki), Joetsu Line (Takasaki - Shin-Maebashi) and Ryōmō Line (Shin-Maebashi - Maebashi)
 Utsunomiya Line (Ueno - Kuroiso)
 Tōkaidō Main Line (Tokyo - Atami / Numazu) and Itō Line (Atami to Itō)
 Shōnan–Shinjuku Line ( - )
 Yokosuka Line ( - Ōfuna) and Utsunomiya Line (Ōmiya - )
 Tōkaidō Main Line (Ōfuna - Odawara), Takasaki Line (Ōmiya - Takasaki), Joetsu Line (Takasaki - Shin-Maebashi) and Ryōmō Line (Shin-Maebashi - Maebashi)

Formations

10-car K sets
, 42 ten-car sets (K-01–K-42) are based at the Kōzu depot in Kanagawa Prefecture and formed as shown below with four motored ("M") cars and six non-powered trailer ("T") cars.

 Cars 3 and 9 each have one PS33B single-arm pantograph.
 Cars 1 and 10 have a wheelchair space.
 Cars 1, 5, and 10 each have a toilet (universal design in cars 1 and 10).
 Car 8 is designated as a mildly air-conditioned car.
 Cars 4 and 5 are bilevel Green Cars.

10-car U sets
, 49 ten-car sets (U501–U541, U584–U591) are based at the Oyama depot in Tochigi Prefecture and formed as shown below with four motored ("M") cars and six non-powered trailer ("T") cars.

 Cars 3 and 8 each have one PS33B single-arm pantograph.
 Cars 1 and 10 have a wheelchair space.
 Cars 1, 5, and 6 each have a toilet (universal design in car 1, Japanese-style in car 6).
 Car 8 is designated as a mildly air-conditioned car.
 Cars 4 and 5 are bilevel Green Cars.

5-car sets
, 34 five-car sets (S-01–S-34) are based at Kōzu depot in Kanagawa Prefecture and 35 five-car sets (U2–U118) are based at Oyama depot in Tochigi Prefecture. They are formed as shown below with two motored ("M") cars and three non-powered trailer ("T") cars.

 Car 13 has one PS33B single-arm pantograph.
 Cars 11 and 15 have a wheelchair space.
 Car 11 has a universal design toilet.

Interior

E231-3000 series

From 2017, former E231-0 series ten-car sets based at Mitaka Depot for use on Chūō–Sōbu Line services were reformed and converted to become four-car E231-3000 series sets based at Kawagoe for use on Kawagoe Line and Hachikō Line services. The first set entered revenue service on the line on 19 February 2018.

Between June 2020 and September 2021, the trains were modified for driver-only operation.

Lines served 
 Hachikō Line (Hachiōji - Komagawa)
 Kawagoe Line (Komagawa - Kawagoe)

Formation

, six four-car sets (41-46) are based at Kawagoe depot in Saitama and formed as shown below with two motored ("M") cars and two non-powered trailer ("T") cars.

 Car 3 has one PS33B single-arm pantograph.
 Cars 1 and 4 have a wheelchair space.

Former set/car identities
The former identities of the E231-3000 series sets are as follows.

See also
 E233 series, successor
 E331 series, experimental articulated train
 E531 series, dual-voltage derivative
 Sotetsu 10000 series, an E231 series derivative
 Toei 10-300 series, an E231 series derivative
 Tokyu 5000 series, an E231 series derivative
 SP1900 EMU, an MTR (ex-KCR) train type based on E231 series technology
 Nankai 8000 series, partly using same parts as E231

References

Further reading

External links

 JR E231 series 
 Kawasaki Heavy Industries product information 
 Tokyu Car product information 

Electric multiple units of Japan
East Japan Railway Company
Train-related introductions in 2000
Kawasaki multiple units
1500 V DC multiple units of Japan
Tokyu Car multiple units